The 32nd World Orienteering Championships were held in Inverness, Scotland, United Kingdom.

Results

Men

Sprint 
4.1 km, 23 controls

Middle 
6.2 km, 25 controls

Long 

15.4 km, 32 controls

Relay

Women

Sprint 

3.8 km, 21 controls

Middle 

5.3 km, 21 controls

Long 

9.7 km, 19 controls

Relay

Mixed

Sprint relay

References 

World Orienteering Championships
2015 in Scottish sport
International sports competitions hosted by Scotland
Sport in Inverness
August 2015 sports events in the United Kingdom
Orienteering in Scotland
21st century in Inverness
2015 in orienteering